The Venturi Atlantique LM is a high-performance racing-oriented version of the Venturi Atlantique road car, designed, developed, and built by French manufacturer Venturi, for sports car racing between 1993 and 1996. It started out as the Venturi 500 LM in 1993, then eventually evolving into the Venturi 600 LM in 1994, before finally becoming the Venturi 600 S-LM in 1995.

References

Grand tourer racing cars